Conestogo Lake is an artificial lake on the Conestogo River in Wellington County in Southwestern Ontario, Canada.  It is a reservoir with a flood control dam.

History

Flood control measures had been first used in the 1890s and also by the construction of the Shand Dam that gave form to Lake Belwood in 1942, but a long term solution was still needed.

The dam was proposed by the then Grand River Conservation Commission in 1952, but construction did not begin until 1955 due to local disputes, Hurricane Hazel and lack of government funding during the Korean War.  Construction of the dam was completed in late 1957 (roadwork and other items not relating to the dam control were completed after) and officially opened in October 1958.

Impact

Besides lessened flooding the dam resulted in a number of roads cut off. Two roads were re-routed:

 Wellington County Road 11 was rerouted around dam north of Wellington County Road 45 with former section south of damn now called Sailing Club Road

 Leslie Lane is rerouted via Wellington County Road 3, 5 and 10 over two sections

A few roads are now severed and some with sections with different names: 

 Side Road 15 is severed with no rerouting or renaming

 Selinger Road west of dam and 4 Line east of the dam
 Concession Road 6 west of dam and 6 Line east of dam

Land was also lost with areas now under water. While impact was minimal to Quarindale and Kumpfville, parts of the former village of Hollen are now underwater.

Conestogo Lake Conservation Area

Conestogo Lake Conservation Area is a recreation area located at the south end of Conestogo Lake near the community of Glen Allan and managed by the Grand River Conservation Authority. Most activities involves use of the lake and during non-winter months. The conservation area hosts snowmobile trails during the winter months when snow is present. Access to the facility is made via Wellington County Road 11.

References 

Lakes of Ontario